(French for The Rooster or The Cock) may refer to:

Persons 
 Robert le Coq (died 1373), French bishop and councillor
 Karl Ludwig von Le Coq (1754–1829) of French Huguenot ancestry, first joined the army of the Electorate of Saxony, later transferred his loyalty to the Kingdom of Prussia and fought Napoleonic Wars
 Karl Christian Erdmann von Le Coq (1767–1830), a Saxon officer who rose to rank lieutenant-general during the Napoleonic Wars and was the commanding officer of the Royal Saxon army
 Albert von Le Coq (1860–1930), German archaeologist and explorer of Central Asia
 Bernard Le Coq (born 1950), French actor
 Pierre Le Coq (born 1989), French competitive sailor

Places
Dommartin-le-Coq, commune in the Aube department in north-central France
Juillac-le-Coq, commune in the Charente department in southwestern France
Montignac-le-Coq, commune in the Charente department in southwestern France
Saint-André-le-Coq, commune in the Puy-de-Dôme department in Auvergne in central France
De Haan, Belgium, town in Belgium whose French name is Le Coq

Other uses 
 A. Le Coq, Estonian brewery
 Le Coq Musique, record label based in the UK
 Le Coq Sportif, French sports equipment and apparel manufacturer
 Lilleküla Stadium, also known as A. Le Coq Arena
 TTÜ-A. Le Coq (1989-2002), former Estonian professional basketball club
 TTÜ/A. Le Coq (2000-2004), former Estonian professional basketball club

See also
Lecoq
De Haan (disambiguation)
De Haan, Belgium, known in French as "Le Coq"